The Northwoods League is a collegiate summer baseball wooden bat league. All players in the league must have NCAA eligibility remaining in order to participate. The league is amateur, and players are not paid, so as to maintain their college eligibility. Graduated senior pitchers are also eligible to play in the Northwoods League. Each team may have four of these players at a time.

Teams play 72 games scheduled from late May to mid-August. The season itself is broken into two halves, with the winners of each half in each of the four sub-divisions playing against each other to determine a sub-divisional champion in a best-of-three series. The sub-divisional champions then meet in a winner-take-all game to determine a divisional champion. The divisional champions then meet in a winner-take-all game for the league championship.

In 2020, some teams cancelled their season due to the COVID-19 pandemic. For those teams that did play, instead of playing within their usual divisions, they played in hub regions, with some creating "temporary teams".

History 
Established in 1994, the Northwoods League was the first for-profit summer collegiate baseball league. It has more teams and plays more games than any other summer collegiate baseball league. The Northwoods League drew over 1.1 Million fans for the fourth consecutive year in 2017. The purpose of the league is to develop players while college baseball teams are not allowed to work out. Many of the teams in the league play in ballparks formerly occupied by professional clubs from the Midwest League, Prairie League, Northern League, and Frontier League. The wooden bat circuit allows communities deemed too small for professional ball to continue to enjoy high-quality, competitive baseball during the summer months. The Northwoods League was the first summer collegiate baseball league to broadcast on the ESPN network, and currently webcasts all of its games.

The teams are located in the Northwoods region of the Upper Midwestern United States and Northwestern Ontario, mostly in the U.S. states of Minnesota (five teams) and Wisconsin (nine teams); also with three teams in Michigan, two in North Dakota, and one team each in Iowa, Illinois, Indiana and Ontario.

Over 200 league alumni have gone on to play in Major League Baseball (MLB) with 91 alumni entering the MLB ranks from 2013 to 2017. Alumni Max Scherzer, the 2017 National League Cy Young Award winner, and American League runner-up Chris Sale faced each other as the starting pitchers in the 2017 and 2018 Major League Baseball All-Star Games.

Competition 
In small cities it may be hard to find the financial stability in a newly founded baseball league. The Northwoods League (NWL) realized it needed to gain significant revenue from sponsors in order to succeed. According to league Chairman and co-founder Dick Radatz, Jr, two-thirds of the revenue comes from sponsors and the remainder from ticket sales, concessions, and team merchandise. Radatz also noted the importance of having the sponsor revenue before the beginning of the season.

Teams

Map of teams

Franchise timeline

Not included are the temporary teams that were created and made for 2020 as teams had to cancel their season or only play locally/regionally.

Champions

From 1994-2018, the league championship series was a best-of-3 between the two division champions. When the league expanded in 2019, the championship became a one-game playoff.

Notable Northwoods League alumni

Jeremy Accardo, Alexandria Beetles, 2001
Scott Alexander, La Crosse Loggers, 2008
Pete Alonso, Madison Mallards, 2014
Cody Asche, Duluth Huskies, 2009-2010
Clint Barmes, Kenosha Kroakers, 1998, Waterloo Bucks, 1999
Joe Bisenius, Duluth Huskies, 2003
Javier Baez, Wausau Woodchunks, 2010
T.J. Bohn, Brainerd Mighty Gulls, 2001
Rob Brantly, La Crosse Loggers, 2009
Corbin Burnes,Waterloo Bucks, 2014-2015
Lance Broadway, Wisconsin Woodchucks, 2004
Trevor Brown, La Crosse Loggers, 2011
Mike Burns, Brainerd Mighty Gulls, 1998–1999
Kole Calhoun, Eau Claire Express, 2007-2009
Matt Cepicky, Waterloo Bucks, 1997
Matt Chapman, La Crosse Loggers, 2012
Jermaine Clark, Kenosha Kroakers, 1995
Willie Collazo, Waterloo Bucks, 1999
Allen Craig, Alexandria Beetles, 2003, 2005
Paul DeJong, Wisconsin Woodchucks, 2014
Chris Demaria, St. Cloud River Bats, 2000–2001
Thomas Diamond, St. Cloud River Bats, 2002–2003
Andy Dominique, Kenosha Kroakers, 1995
Jeff Duncan, Waterloo Bucks, 1998
Lucas Duda, Alexandria Beetles, 2006
Andre Ethier, Rochester Honkers, 2002
Dave Gassner, Wausau Woodchucks, 1998
Jay Gibbons, Manitowoc Skunks, 1996–1997
Tom Gorzelanny, St. Cloud River Bats, 2001
Curtis Granderson, Mankato Mashers, 2001
Eric Haase, Wausau Woodchunks, 2010
Mitch Haniger, Green Bay Bullfrogs, 2009
Jack Hannahan, Mankato Mashers, 1999
Daniel Ray Herrera, La Crosse Loggers, 2005
Tyler Hoechlin, Battle Creek Bombers, 2007
Justin Huisman, St. Cloud River Bats, 1998
Brett Jackson, La Crosse Loggers, 2007
Casey Janssen, Wisconsin Woodchucks, 2001
Jimmy Journell, Waterloo Bucks, 1997, 1999
Bobby Kielty, Kenosha Kroakers, 1996
Andrew Knapp, La Crosse Loggers, 2011
Mark Lowe, Wisconsin Woodchucks, 2002–2003
Jay Marshall, Rochester Honkers, 2002
Doug Mathis, Duluth Huskies, 2003
Mark Melancon, Duluth Huskies, 2004
Paul McAnulty, Mankato Mashers, 2001
Carlos Muñiz, Alexandria Beetles, 2002
Pat Neshek, Wisconsin Woodchucks, 2000
Josh Newman, Alexandria Beetles, 2001
Wes Obermueller, Wausau Woodchucks, 1995, Waterloo Bucks, 1996–1997
Jordan Pacheco, La Crosse Loggers, 2005
Val Pascucci, Rochester Honkers, 1998
Juan Pierre, Manitowoc Skunks, 1996
Robb Quinlan, Dubuque Mud Puppies, 1996, St. Cloud River Bats, 1998
Erasmo Ramirez, Kenosha Kroakers, 1995
Mike Rouse, Brainerd Mighty Gulls, 1999
Chris Sale, La Crosse Loggers, 2008
Max Scherzer, La Crosse Loggers, 2004
Shawn Sedlacek, Dubuque Mud Puppies, 1996
George Sherrill, Kenosha Kroakers, 1997
Drew Smyly, Duluth Huskies, 2009
Ryan Spilborghs, Madison Mallards, 2001
Eric Thames, La Crosse Loggers, 2007
Mike Trout, La Crosse Loggers, 2008
Curtis Thigpen, Waterloo Bucks, 2002
Jeff Weaver, Dubuque Mud Puppies, 1995
Josh Willingham, Austin Southern Minny Stars, 1998–1999
Danny Worth, Alexandria Beetles, 2006
Ben Zobrist, Wisconsin Woodchucks, 2003
Jordan Zimmermann, Eau Claire Express 2006
Anton Kuznetsov,Eau Claire Express, 2013-2015

Umpiring 
The Northwoods League, in addition to
being a developmental league for players
and coaches, is also a developmental league for umpires. The concentrated game schedule, travel, and Minor League-like game conditions give NWL umpires a pre-professional experience. Since the League's inaugural season in 1994, 44 of its former umpires have furthered their careers in affiliated professional baseball.

The League recruits its umpires from the two umpire schools whose curricula have been approved by the Professional Baseball Umpire Corps. (PBUC): The Minor League Umpire training Academy and Harry Wendelstedt School for Umpires. The umpires ultimately chosen are usually among the top school graduates who were then selected to the pre-season, PBUC sponsored Umpire Evaluation Course.

The NWL contracts with eleven three-man crews during the regular season, a six-man crew during the mid-season All-Star game, and six umpires for both the divisional playoffs and championship series.

Notes

References

External links
Official website

Summer baseball leagues
College baseball leagues in the United States
Baseball leagues in Canada
Baseball leagues in Iowa
Baseball leagues in Minnesota
Baseball leagues in Wisconsin
Sports leagues established in 1994
1994 establishments in the United States